Michael Schröder (born 10 November 1959) is a German former professional footballer who played as a midfielder. He works as a scout for Hamburger SV.

Honours 
Hamburger SV
 European Cup: 1982–83
 UEFA Cup: runner-up 1981–82
 Bundesliga: 1981–82, 1982–83

VfB Stuttgart
 UEFA Cup: runner-up 1988–89

References

External links 
 

1959 births
Living people
German footballers
Association football midfielders
Bundesliga players
2. Bundesliga players
Hamburger SV players
VfB Stuttgart players
Tennis Borussia Berlin players
West German footballers
Footballers from Hamburg
Hamburger SV non-playing staff